Linky Boshoff and Ilana Kloss were the defending champions but did not participate due to Boshoff's retirement and Kloss' return to World TeamTennis.
Helena Anliot and Helle Sparre-Viragh won the title after defeating Barbara Hallquist and Sheila McInerney in the final.

Seeds
A champion seed is indicated in bold text while text in italics indicates the round in which that seed was eliminated.

Draw

Finals

Top half

Bottom half

References

External links

U.S. Clay Court Championships
1978 U.S. Clay Court Championships